The chapters for the manga Shijō Saikyō no Deshi Ken'ichi are written and illustrated by Syun Matsuena. The story of manga focuses on Kenichi Shirahama, an average 16-year-old high school student who has been picked on but after meeting mysterious transfer student, Miu Fūrinji, and following her advice of joining a dojo named , his life starts to change. The manga was serialized in Shogakukan's magazine Weekly Shōnen Sunday from April 2002 to September 2014. Its 583 chapters were collected sixty-one tankōbon volumes, released from  August 9, 2002 to February 18, 2015.



Volume list

Volumes 1–20

Volumes 21–40

Volumes 41–61

References

Kenichi: The Mightiest Disciple
Lists of manga volumes and chapters